Anthela cnecias is a moth of the Anthelidae family. It is found in Australia.

References

Moths described in 1921
Anthelidae